TLA may refer to:

Organisations
 Tennessee Library Association, a professional organization for librarians in Tennessee
 Texas Library Association, a professional organization for librarians in Texas
 Tour de las Américas, a professional golf tour in Latin America
 The Littlehampton Academy, a school in Sussex, England

Entertainment
 Theatre of Living Arts, a music venue in Philadelphia, Pennsylvania. US
 TLA Entertainment Group, a movie retailer and distributor spinoff from the former
 TLA Releasing, its film distribution division
 Avatar: The Last Airbender, a Nickelodeon cartoon that aired from 2005 to 2008.

Places
 Tlaxcala (ISO 3166-2:MX code MX-TLA), a Mexican state

Science and technology
 Temporal light artefacts, undesired visual effects caused by light modulations
 Temporal logic of actions, a logic used to describe behaviours of concurrent systems
 Top-level await, an async/await language feature for JavaScript
 Tom Lord's Arch, a revision control system now known as GNU arch

Transport
 Teller Airport (IATA code), Alaska, US

Other uses
 Three-letter acronym or abbreviation
 Teaching & Learning Academy, an English teacher training programme
 Southwestern Tepehuán language (ISO 639-3 code), from North-Western Mexico

See also
 TLA+, a formal specification language written in Java